The Love Parade is a 1929 American pre-Code musical comedy film, directed by Ernst Lubitsch and starring Maurice Chevalier and Jeanette MacDonald, involving the marital difficulties of Queen Louise of Sylvania (MacDonald) and her consort, Count Alfred Renard (Chevalier). Despite his love for Louise and his promise to be an obedient husband, Count Alfred finds his role as a figurehead unbearable. The supporting cast features Lupino Lane, Lillian Roth and Eugene Pallette.

The film was directed by Lubitsch from a screenplay by Guy Bolton and Ernest Vajda adapted from the French play Le Prince Consort, written by Jules Chancel and Leon Xanrof. The play had previously been adapted for Broadway in 1905 by William Boosey and Cosmo Gordon Lennox.

The Love Parade is notable for being both the film debut of Jeanette MacDonald and the first "talkie" film made by Ernst Lubitsch. The picture was also released in a French-language version called Parade d'amour. Chevalier had thought that he would never be capable of acting as a Royal courtier, and had to be persuaded by Lubitsch. This huge box-office hit appeared just after the Wall Street crash, and did much to save the fortunes of Paramount.

Plot
Count Alfred (Maurice Chevalier), military attaché to the Sylvanian Embassy in Paris, is ordered back to Sylvania to report to Queen Louise for a reprimand following a string of scandals, including an affair with the ambassador's wife. In the meantime Queen Louise (Jeanette MacDonald), ruler of Sylvania in her own right, is royally fed-up with her subjects' preoccupation with whom she will marry (particularly since they would only be a prince consort)

Intrigued rather than offended by Count Alfred's dossier, Queen Louise invites him to dinner when she tries to find a suitable "punishment" for him. Their romance progresses to the point of marriage when, despite his qualms, for love of Louise Alfred agrees to obey the Queen. However, he soon chafes at the standards of living as a consort, which mainly consist of little to do (where even trying to make suggestions to affairs of state) that forces him to take action.

Cast
 Maurice Chevalier as Count Alfred Renard
 Jeanette MacDonald as Queen Louise
 Lupino Lane as Jacques
 Lillian Roth as Lulu
 Eugene Pallette as Minister of War
 E. H. Calvert as Sylvanian Ambassador
 Edgar Norton as Master of Ceremonies
 Lionel Belmore as Prime Minister

Production
Although The Love Parade was Lubitsch's first sound film, he already displayed a mastery of the technical requirements of the day.  In one scene, two couples sing the same song alternately. To do this with the available technology, Lubitsch had two sets built, with an off-camera orchestra between them, and directed both scenes simultaneously.  This enabled him to cut back and forth from one scene to the other in editing, something unheard of at the time.

Music
All songs are by Victor Schertzinger (music) and Clifford Grey (lyrics):

 "Ooh, La La" – sung by Lupino Lane
 "Paris, Stay the Same" – sung by Maurice Chevalier and Lupino Lane
 "Dream Lover" – sung by Jeanette MacDonald and chorus, reprise sung by Jeanette MacDonald
 "Anything to Please the Queen" – sung by Jeanette MacDonald and Maurice Chevalier
 "My Love Parade" – sung by Maurice Chevalier and Jeanette MacDonald
 "Let's Be Common" – sung by Lupino Lane and Lillian Roth
 "March of the Grenadiers" – sung by Jeanette MacDonald and chorus, reprise sung by chorus
 "Nobody's Using It Now" – sung by Maurice Chevalier
 "The Queen Is Always Right" – sung by Lupino Lane, Lillian Roth and chorus

Awards and honors
The Love Parade was nominated for six Academy Awards:

1929–1930 Academy Awards

References
Notes

External links
 
 
 
 
 
 Criterion Collection essay Michael Koresky at criterion.com; accessed November 29, 2023. 
 The Love Parade, jeanettemacdonaldandnelsoneddy.com; accessed August 6, 2015.
 The Love Parade, virtual-history.com; accessed August 6, 2015.

1929 films
1929 musical comedy films
American musical comedy films
American black-and-white films
1920s English-language films
Films directed by Ernst Lubitsch
Films scored by John Leipold
Films set in Europe
American multilingual films
Paramount Pictures films
1920s multilingual films
1920s American films